"Addictive Love" is a number-one R&B single by the gospel duo BeBe & CeCe Winans from their album Different Lifestyles. The song spent two weeks at number one on the US R&B chart. It ranked #364 on Songs of the Century.

See also
List of number-one R&B singles of 1991 (U.S.)

References

1991 singles
1991 songs
Gospel songs